Salanpur  is a community development block that forms an administrative division in Asansol subdivision of Paschim Bardhaman district in the Indian state of West Bengal.

Geography 

Salanpur CD Block is bounded by Jamtara and Nala CD Blocks, in Jamtara district of Jharkhand, on the north, Barabani CD Block on the east, Asansol (municipal corporation) and after that Neturia CD Block, in Purulia district, on the south and Nirsa and Baliapur CD Blocks, in Dhanbad district of Jharkhand, on the west.

It has 1 panchayat samity, 11 gram panchayats, 96 gram sansads (village councils), 74 mouzas and 69 inhabited villages. Chittaranjan and Salanpur police stations serve this block. Headquarters of this CD Block is at Rupnarayanpur.

Gram panchayats of Salanpur block/panchayat samiti are: Achhra, Alladi, Basudevpur-Jemari, Dendua, Ethora, Fulberia-Bolkunda, Jitpur-Uttarrampur, Kallya, Rupnarayanpur, Salanpur and Samdi.

Demographics

Population
As per the 2011 Census of India Salanpur CD Block had a total population of 160,357, of which 101,360 were rural and 61,697 were urban. There were 83,796 (51%) males and 79,261 (49%) females. Population below 6 years was 17,118. Scheduled Castes numbered 39,294 (24.10%) and Scheduled Tribes numbered 17,084 (10.48%).

As per 2001 census, Salanpur block had a total population of 156,338, out of which 82,741 were males and 73,597 were females.  Salanpur  block registered a population growth of 9.64 per cent during the 1991-2001 decade. Decadal growth for Bardhaman district was 14.36 per cent. Decadal growth in West Bengal was 17.84 per cent. Scheduled castes at 35,898 formed around one-fifth the population. Scheduled tribes numbered 17,143.

Census Towns in Salanpur CD Block are (2011 census figures in brackets): Chittaranjan (39,098) and Hindusthan Cables Town (22,599).

Large villages (with 4,000+ population) in Salanpur CD Block are (2011 census figures in brackets): Salanpur (4,739), Jemari (4,321), Ethora (4,547) and Kalya (703).

Other villages in Salanpur CD Block include (2011census figures in brackets): Alladi (2,384), Dendua (2,297),  Rupnarayanpur (2,242), Uttarrampur (1,331), Jitpur (1,532), Achhra (2,584), Phulberya (1,918), Bolkunda (1,351), Shyamdi (3,265) and Basudebpur (3,098).

Literacy
As per the 2011 census the total number of literates in Salanpur CD Block was 114,940 (78.76% of the population over 6 years) out of which males numbered 64,520 (86.12% of the male population over 6 years) and females numbered 50,420 (70.99% of the female population over 6 years). The gender disparity (the difference between female and male literacy rates) was 15.13%.

As per 2001 census, Salanpur block had a total literacy of 78.22 per cent for the 6+ age group. While male literacy was 87.07 per cent female literacy was 68.20 per cent. Bardhaman district had a total literacy of 70.18 per cent, male literacy being 78.63 per cent and female literacy being 60.95 per cent.

See also – List of West Bengal districts ranked by literacy rate

Language and religion
As per census definition, mother-tongue is the language spoken in childhood by the person's mother to the person. As a mother-tongue, Bengali has decreased its share from 82.3% of the population of Bardhaman district in 1961 to 79.9% in 2001, Hindi has increased its share from 8.5% in 1961 to 10.9% in 2001 Santali has remained steady at around 4.9% during the period, and Urdu has increased its share from 2.4% in 1961 to 2.6% in 2001. Other mother-tongues spoken in 2001 were: Odiya (0.3%), Punjabi (0.2%), Koda/Kora (0.2%), Telugu (0.1%), Bhojpuri (0.1%), Nepali (0.1%) and Kurukh/ Oraon (0.1%).

As of 2017, CD Block-wise/ other region-wise break-up of mother tongue is not available in census/ other official sources. There have been reports in the media about the Hindi speaking population being substantial in the Asansol (Lok Sabha constituency). Bardhaman district provided attractive livelihood opportunities for immigrants from Bihar/ Jharkhand.

According to the West Bengal Official Language Act 1961 and the West Bengal Official Language (Amendment Act) 2012, the Bengali language is to be used for official purposes in the whole of West Bengal. In addition to Bengali, the Nepali language is to be used for official purposes in the three hills subdivisions, namely Darjeeling, Kalimpong and Kurseong, in the district of Darjeeling, and Urdu is to be used for official purposes in district/subdivision/ block/ municipality where the population speaking Urdu exceeds 10% of the total population.  The English language will continue to be used for official purposes as it was being used prior to the enactment of these laws.

The West Bengal Official Language (Second Amendment) Bill, 2012, included Hindi, Santhali, Odiya and Punjabi as official languages  if it is spoken by a population exceeding 10 per cent of the whole in a particular block or sub-division or a district.  Subsequently, Kamtapuri, Rajbanshi and Kurmali were also included in the list of minority languages by the West Bengal Official Language (Second Amendment) Bill, 2018. However, as of 2019, there is no official / other reliable information about the areas covered.

In the 2011 census Hindus numbered 153,776 and formed 94.31% of the population in Salanpur CD Block. Muslims numbered 5,825 and formed 3.57% of the population. Christians numbered 1,816 and formed 1.11% of the population. Others numbered 1,640 and formed 1.01% of the population.

Rural poverty
As per poverty estimates obtained from household survey for families living below poverty line in 2005, rural poverty in Salanpur CD Block was 24.27%.

Economy

Livelihood

In Salanpur CD Block in 2011, amongst the class of total workers, cultivators numbered 2,291 and formed 4.41% of the total workers, agricultural labourers numbered 3,288 and formed 6.44%, household industry workers numbered 1,133 and formed 2.22% and other workers numbered 44.346 and formed 86.85%. Total workers numbered 51,058 and formed 31.31% of the total population, and non-workers numbered 111,999 and formed 68.69% of the population.

Coalmines are spread across the Andal, Pandaveswar, Raniganj, Jamuria, Barabani and Salanpur region, including municipal areas. Livelihood in this region is coal-centred. The area does not produce much of agricultural products. Overall work participation rate, and female work participation rate, in the mining area are low. Interestingly the work participation rate in the predominantly agricultural rural areas of erstwhile Bardhaman district is higher than in the predominantly urbanised mining area. Human development in the mining area does not at all look good. However, in the composite livelihood index the mining area performs much better than the non-mining areas of erstwhile Bardhaman district. The decadal (1991-2001) change in composition of workers shows the growing pressure of population growth, as well as of migrants from adjacent Jharkhand.

Note: In the census records a person is considered a cultivator, if the person is engaged in cultivation/ supervision of land owned by self/government/institution. When a person who works on another person's land for wages in cash or kind or share, is regarded as an agricultural labourer. Household industry is defined as an industry conducted by one or more members of the family within the household or village, and one that does not qualify for registration as a factory under the Factories Act. Other workers are persons engaged in some economic activity other than cultivators, agricultural labourers and household workers.  It includes factory, mining, plantation, transport and office workers, those engaged in business and commerce, teachers, entertainment artistes and so on.

Infrastructure
All 74 or 100% of mouzas in Salanpur CD Block were electrified by 31 March 2014. 

All 74 mouzas in Salanpur CD Block had drinking water facilities in 2013–14. There were 9 fertiliser depots, 3 seed stores and 32 fair price shops in the CD Block.

Coal mining
Coal mining in India first started in the Raniganj Coalfield. In 1774, John Sumner and Suetonius Grant Heatly of the British East India Company found coal near Ethora, presently in Salanpur CD Block.

See also – Salanpur Area and Sodepur Area of Eastern Coalfields

Mohanpur open cast project in Salanpur Area of Eastern Coalfields is undergoing expansion to 2.5 million tonnes per year.
Gourandi Extension In Salanpur Area of Eastern Coalfields has a mineable reserve of 15.44 million tonnes.

With extensive underground mining for many years, this area has been facing the problem of land subsidence. About 361 villages under the Raniganj and Salanpur coalfield areas are the victims of subsidence.

Industry
Chittaranjan Locomotive Works at Chittaranjan is one of the largest electric locomotive manufacturers in the world. Established in 1950, it produced steam locomotives up to 1972. It is named after the great Indian independence movement activist, Chittaranjan Das.

The Rupnarayanpur unit of Hindustan Cables was closed on 1 February 2017. Hindustan Cables was set up in 1952 at Rupnarayanpur. It later set up units at Hyderabad and Naini, Allahabad. Both the Rupnarayanpur and Hyderabad units, which produced polythene insulated jelly filled cables, had stopped producing in 2003, as BSNL and MTNL did not need such cables anymore.

Bhushan Steel signed an agreement with the West Bengal government to set a 2 million tonne steel plant, with auxiliary facilities, at Salanpur, in 2007. The company expected to get around 2,500 acres of land acquired in the subsequent one year and start production in 2012. With growing resistance to land acquisition the state government was not able to make much headway. In 2012, Bhusan Steel put the project on hold.

Agriculture
Although the Bargadari Act of 1950 recognised the rights of bargadars to a higher share of crops from the land that they tilled, it was not implemented fully. Large tracts, beyond the prescribed limit of land ceiling, remained with the rich landlords. From 1977 onwards major land reforms took place in West Bengal. Land in excess of land ceiling was acquired and distributed amongst the peasants. Following land reforms land ownership pattern has undergone transformation. In 2013–14, persons engaged in agriculture in Salanpur CD Block could be classified as follows: bargadars 2.44%, patta (document) holders 37.94%, small farmers (possessing land between 1 and 2 hectares) 5.68%, marginal farmers (possessing land up to 1 hectare) 27.08% and agricultural labourers 26.86%.

In 2003-04 net cropped area in Salanpur CD Block was 4,681 hectares and the area in which more than one crop was grown was 946 hectares.

In 2013–14, Salanpur CD Block produced 17,215 tonnes of Aman paddy, the main winter crop, from 8,142 hectares. It also produced pulses.

Banking
In 2013–14, Salanpur CD Block had offices of 7 commercial banks and 2 gramin banks.

Transport
Salanpur CD Block has 6 originating/ terminating bus routes.

The Asansol-Patna section of the Howrah-Delhi main line passes through this CD Block. There are stations at Salanpur and Rupnarayanpur,

The Kolkata-Delhi NH 19 (old numbering NH 2) passes through this block.

State Highway 5 (West Bengal) running from Rupnarayanpur (in Bardhaman district) to Junput (in Purba Medinipur district) originates from this block.

Asansol-Chittaranjan road links to both NH 19 and Grand Trunk Road and thereafter it links to Jamtara in Jharkhand and from there to places such as Dumka and Karmatanr.

Education
In 2013–14, Salanpur CD Block had 75 primary schools with 10,260 students, 4 middle schools with 379 students, 6 high schools with 3,634 students and 9 higher secondary schools with 7,894 students. Salanpur CD Block had 1 general college with 1,411 students, 5 technical/ professional institution with 730 students and 274 institutions for special and non-formal education with 9,079 students.

Deshbandhu Mahavidyalaya was established at Chittaranjan in 1973. It is affiliated with the Kazi Nazrul University.

Culture
Kalyaneshwari Temple is a 500-year-old centre of Shakti worship. Legend has it that human sacrifices were offered at Kalyaneshwari in the remote past. The present temple, however, is not very old and was constructed by Panchakot Raj. The temple of Goddess Kalyaneshwari is believed to fulfill the wishes of childless women.

Healthcare
In 2014, Salanpur CD Block had 1 block primary health centre, 3 primary health centres, 2 medical institutions of central government/ PSUs and 2 private nursing homes with total 517 beds and 52 doctors (excluding private bodies). It had 13 family welfare sub centres. 10,229 patients were treated indoor and 117,995 patients were treated outdoor in the hospitals, health centres and subcentres of the CD Block.

Pithaikeary Rural Hospital, with 30 beds, at Rupnarayanpur, is the major government medical facility in the Salanpur CD block. There are primary health centres at Dabor, PO Achra (with 10 beds), and Parbotpur, PO Samdi (with 2 beds). Kasturba Gandhi Hospital at Chittaranjan functions with 150 beds.

External links
 District map showing blocks

References

Community development blocks in Paschim Bardhaman district
Mining communities in West Bengal